Poropuntius deauratus is a species of ray-finned fish in the genus Poropuntius which is found in coastal river drainages in central Vietnam: between the Thu Bon River in  Quang Nam Province and the Quang Tri River in Quang Tri Province. There was a marked decline in this species' abundance between 2-000 and 2009 when the population may have declined by as much as 80%, this decline was probably caused by overfishing. Its habitat is medium and small sized rivers and streams where it is normally found in fast-flowing, clear water and it cannot survive where these are impounded. It diet mainly consists of fine debris, algae, diatoms, and aquatic insects.

References 

deauratus
Fish described in 1842